The Cannon class was a class of destroyer escorts  built by the United States primarily for antisubmarine warfare and convoy escort service during World War II.  The lead ship, USS Cannon, was commissioned on 26 September 1943 at Wilmington, Delaware. Of the 116 ships ordered, 44 were cancelled and six were commissioned directly into the Free French Forces. Destroyer escorts were regular companions escorting vulnerable cargo ships.

With the decommissioning of the Philippine Navy's BRP Rajah Humabon (PS-11) in March 2018; HTMS Pin Klao (DE-413) of the Royal Thai Navy is the only ship of the class in commission.

Propulsion
The class was also known as the DET type from their diesel electric tandem drives. The DET's substitution for a turboelectric propulsion plant was the primary difference with the predecessor  ("TE") class. The DET was, in turn, replaced with a direct-drive diesel plant to yield the design of the successor  ("FMR") class.

Hull numbers

A total of 72 ships of the Cannon class were built.

 DE-99  through DE-113 (six are French)
 DE-162 through DE-197
 DE-739 through DE-750
 DE-763 through DE-771

Wartime transfers 

During World War II, six ships of the class were earmarked for the Free French Naval Forces and a further eight were transferred the Brazilian Navy.

Free French ships
 as Sénégalais
 as Algérien
 as Tunisien
 as Marocain
 as Hova
 as Somali

Transferred to Brazil
  as Babitonga
  as Baependi
  as Benevente
  as Beberibe
  as Bocaina
  as Bauru - now a museum ship in Rio de Janeiro
  as Bertioga
  as Bracui

Postwar dispersal 
After the end of World War II, the United States Navy transferred many ships of the Cannon class to other navies.

Transferred to France
  as Malgache (F724); served 1952-1969
  as Touareg (F721); served 1950-1960
  as Soudanais (F722); served 1950-1959
  as Berbère (F723); served 1952-1960
  as Kabyle (F718); served 1950-1959
  as Arabe (F717); served 1950-1968
  as Bambara (F719); served 1950-1959
  as Sakalave (F720); served 1950-1960

Transferred to Greece
 as Leon; served 1951–1992
 as Aetos; served 1951–1991; now a museum ship in Albany, New York, the only destroyer escort afloat in the United States
 as Ierax ; served 1951–1991
 as Panthir; served 1951–1992

Transferred to Italy

  as Andromeda (F 592) 1951; scrapped in 1972
  as Aldebaran (F 590) 1951; scrapped in 1976
  as Altair (F 591) 1951; stricken and sunk as target in 1971

Transferred to Japan

  as Asahi (DE-262) 1955–75 (then to the Philippines)
  as Hatsuhi (DE-263) 1955–75 (then to the Philippines)

Transferred to the Netherlands

  as Van Amstel (F806) 1950
  as Bitter (F807) 1950
  as Van Ewijck (F808) 1950
  as Dubois (F809) 1950
  as Zeeuw (F810) 1950
  as van Zijll (F811) 1950

Transferred to Peru
 as BAP Castilla; served 1951–1979
 as BAP Aguirre; served 1951–1974
 as BAP Rodríguez; served 1951–1979

Transferred to the Philippines

  as BRP Datu Sikatuna (PF-5); scrapped in 1989
  as BRP Rajah Humabon (PF-11); retired in 2018
  as BRP Datu Kalantiaw (PS-76); sunk during a typhoon in 1981
 —cannibalized for parts
 —cannibalized for parts

Transferred to South Korea
  as ROKN Kyong Ki (F-71); served 1956–1977 (then to the Philippines)
  as ROKN Kang Won (F-72); served 1956–1977 (then to the Philippines)

Transferred to the Republic of China (Taiwan)
 as ROCN Taihe (太和)
 as ROCN Taicang (太倉)
 as ROCN Taihu (太湖)
 as ROCN Taizhao (太昭)

Transferred to Thailand
  as HTMS Pin Klao (413)

Transferred to Uruguay
  as Uruguay (DE-1); served 1952–1990
  as Artigas (DE-2); served 1952–1988

Ships in Class

See also
List of Escorteurs of the French Navy
List of ship classes of the Second World War
List of naval ship classes in service

References

External links 

List of Cannon class Destroyer Escorts
Cannon class Destroyer Escort - Photos
USS Slater

 
Frigate classes
Ship classes of the French Navy